A physician (American English), medical practitioner (Commonwealth English), medical doctor, or simply doctor, is a health professional who practices medicine, which is concerned with promoting, maintaining or restoring health through the study, diagnosis, prognosis and treatment of disease, injury, and other physical and mental impairments. Physicians may focus their practice on certain disease categories, types of patients, and methods of treatment—known as specialities—or they may assume responsibility for the provision of continuing and comprehensive medical care to individuals, families, and communities—known as general practice. Medical practice properly requires both a detailed knowledge of the academic disciplines, such as anatomy and physiology, underlying diseases and their treatment—the science of medicine—and also a decent competence in its applied practice—the art or craft of medicine.

Both the role of the physician and the meaning of the word itself vary around the world. Degrees and other qualifications vary widely, but there are some common elements, such as medical ethics requiring that physicians show consideration, compassion, and benevolence for their patients.

Modern meanings

Specialist in internal medicine

Around the world the term physician refers to a specialist in internal medicine or one of its many sub-specialties (especially as opposed to a specialist in surgery). This meaning of physician conveys a sense of expertise in treatment by drugs or medications, rather than by the procedures of surgeons.

This term is at least nine hundred years old in English: physicians and surgeons were once members of separate professions, and traditionally were rivals. The Shorter Oxford English Dictionary, third edition, gives a Middle English quotation making this contrast, from as early as 1400: "O Lord, whi is it so greet difference betwixe a cirugian and a physician."

Henry VIII granted a charter to the London Royal College of Physicians in 1518. It was not until 1540 that he granted the Company of Barber-Surgeons (ancestor of the Royal College of Surgeons) its separate charter. In the same year, the English monarch established the Regius Professorship of Physic at the University of Cambridge. Newer universities would probably describe such an academic as a professor of internal medicine. Hence, in the 16th century, physic meant roughly what internal medicine does now.

Currently, a specialist physician in the United States may be described as an internist. Another term, hospitalist, was introduced in 1996, to describe US specialists in internal medicine who work largely or exclusively in hospitals. Such 'hospitalists' now make up about 19% of all US general internists, who are often called general physicians in Commonwealth countries.

This original use, as distinct from surgeon, is common in most of the world including the United Kingdom and other Commonwealth countries (such as Australia, Bangladesh, India, New Zealand, Pakistan, South Africa, Sri Lanka, and Zimbabwe), as well as in places as diverse as Brazil, Hong Kong, Indonesia, Japan, Ireland, and Taiwan. In such places, the more general English terms doctor or medical practitioner are prevalent, describing any practitioner of medicine (whom an American would likely call a physician, in the broad sense). In Commonwealth countries, specialist pediatricians and geriatricians are also described as specialist physicians who have sub-specialized by age of patient rather than by organ system.

Physician and surgeon

Around the world, the combined term "physician and surgeon" is used to describe either a general practitioner or any medical practitioner irrespective of specialty. This usage still shows the original meaning of physician and preserves the old difference between a physician, as a practitioner of physic, and a surgeon. The term may be used by state medical boards in the United States, and by equivalent bodies in Canadian provinces, to describe any medical practitioner.

North America

In modern English, the term physician is used in two main ways, with relatively broad and narrow meanings respectively. This is the result of history and is often confusing. These meanings and variations are explained below.

In the United States and Canada, the term physician describes all medical practitioners holding a professional medical degree. The American Medical Association, established in 1847, as well as the American Osteopathic Association, founded in 1897, both currently use the term physician to describe members. However, the American College of Physicians, established in 1915, does not: its title uses physician in its original sense.

American physicians
The vast majority of physicians trained in the United States have a Doctor of Medicine degree, and use the initials M.D. A smaller number attend osteopathic medical schools and have a Doctor of Osteopathic Medicine degree and use the initials D.O. The World Directory of Medical Schools lists both MD and DO granting schools as medical schools located in the United States. After completion of medical school, physicians complete a residency in the specialty in which they will practice. Subspecialties require the completion of a fellowship after residency. Both MD and DO physicians participate in the National Resident Matching Program (NRMP) and attend ACGME-accredited residencies and fellowships across all medical specialties to obtain licensure.

All boards of certification now require that physicians demonstrate, by examination, continuing mastery of the core knowledge and skills for a chosen specialty. Recertification varies by particular specialty between every seven and every ten years.

Primary care 
Primary care physicians guide patients in preventing disease and detecting health problems early while they are still treatable. They are divided into two types: family medicine doctors and internal medicine doctors. Family doctors, or family physicians, are trained to care for patients of any age, while internists are trained to care for adults. Family doctors receive training in a variety of care and are therefore also referred to as general practitioners. Family medicine grew out of the general practitioner movement of the 1960s in response to the growing specialization in medicine that was seen as threatening to the doctor-patient relationship and continuity of care.

Podiatrists
In the United States, the American Podiatric Medical Association (APMA) defines podiatrists as physicians and surgeons who treat the foot, ankle, and associated structures of the leg. Podiatrists undergo training with the Doctor of Podiatric Medicine (DPM) degree. The American Medical Association (AMA), however, advocates for the definition of a physician as "an individual possessing degree of either a Doctor of Medicine or Doctor of Osteopathic Medicine." In the US, podiatrists are required to complete three to four years of podiatry residency upon graduating with a DPM degree. After residency, one to two years of fellowship programs are available in plastic surgery, foot and ankle reconstructive surgery, sports medicine, and wound care.

Podiatry residencies and/ or fellowships are not accredited by the ACGME. The overall scope of podiatric practice varies from state to state and is not similar to that of physicians holding an MD or DO degree. DPM is also available at one Canadian university, namely the Université du Québec à Trois-Rivières; students are typically required to complete an internship in New York prior to the obtention of their professional degree. The World Directory of Medical Schools does not list US or Canadian schools of podiatric medicine as medical schools and only lists US-granted MD, DO, and Canadian MD programs as medical schools for the respective regions.

Shortage

Many countries in the developing world have the problem of too few physicians. In 2015, the Association of American Medical Colleges warned that the US will face a doctor shortage of as many as 90,000 by 2025.

Social role and world view

Biomedicine
Within Western culture and over recent centuries, medicine has become increasingly based on scientific reductionism and materialism. This style of medicine is now dominant throughout the industrialized world, and is often termed biomedicine by medical anthropologists. Biomedicine "formulates the human body and disease in a culturally distinctive pattern", and is a world view learnt by medical students. Within this tradition, the medical model is a term for the complete "set of procedures in which all doctors are trained", including mental attitudes. A particularly clear expression of this world view, currently dominant among conventional physicians, is evidence-based medicine. Within conventional medicine, most physicians still pay heed to their ancient traditions:

In this Western tradition, physicians are considered to be members of a learned profession, and enjoy high social status, often combined with expectations of a high and stable income and job security. However, medical practitioners often work long and inflexible hours, with shifts at unsociable times. Their high status is partly from their extensive training requirements, and also because of their occupation's special ethical and legal duties. The term traditionally used by physicians to describe a person seeking their help is the word patient (although one who visits a physician for a routine check-up may also be so described). This word patient is an ancient reminder of medical duty, as it originally meant 'one who suffers'. The English noun comes from the Latin word patiens, the present participle of the deponent verb, patior, meaning 'I am suffering', and akin to the Greek verb  (romanized: paschein, lit. to suffer) and its cognate noun πάθος (pathos, suffering).

Physicians in the original, narrow sense (specialist physicians or internists, see above) are commonly members or fellows of professional organizations, such as the American College of Physicians or the Royal College of Physicians in the United Kingdom, and such hard-won membership is itself a mark of status.

Alternative medicine
While contemporary biomedicine has distanced itself from its ancient roots in religion and magic, many forms of traditional medicine and alternative medicine continue to espouse vitalism in various guises: "As long as life had its own secret properties, it was possible to have sciences and medicines based on those properties". The US National Center for Complementary and Alternative Medicine (NCCAM) classifies complementary and alternative medicine therapies into five categories or domains, including: alternative medical systems, or complete systems of therapy and practice; mind-body interventions, or techniques designed to facilitate the mind's effect on bodily functions and symptoms; biologically based systems including herbalism; and manipulative and body-based methods such as chiropractic and massage therapy.

In considering these alternate traditions that differ from biomedicine (see above), medical anthropologists emphasize that all ways of thinking about health and disease have a significant cultural content, including conventional western medicine.

Ayurveda, Unani medicine, and homeopathy are popular types of alternative medicine.

Physicians' own health
Some commentators have argued that physicians have duties to serve as role models for the general public in matters of health, for example by not smoking cigarettes. Indeed, in most western nations relatively few physicians smoke, and their professional knowledge does appear to have a beneficial effect on their health and lifestyle. According to a study of male physicians, life expectancy is slightly higher for physicians (73 years for white and 69 years for black) than lawyers or many other highly educated professionals. Causes of death which are less likely to occur in physicians than the general population include respiratory disease (including pneumonia, pneumoconioses, COPD, but excluding emphysema and other chronic airway obstruction), alcohol-related deaths, rectosigmoid and anal cancers, and bacterial diseases.

Physicians do experience exposure to occupational hazards, and there is a well-known aphorism that "doctors make the worst patients". Causes of death that are shown to be higher in the physician population include suicide among doctors and self-inflicted injury, drug-related causes, traffic accidents, and cerebrovascular and ischaemic heart disease. Physicians are also prone to occupational burnout. This manifests as a long-term stress reaction characterized by poorer quality of care towards patients, emotional exhaustion, a feeling of decreased personal achievement, and others. A study by the Agency for Healthcare Research and Quality reported that time pressure was the greatest cause of burnout; a survey from the American Medical Association reported that more than half of all respondents chose "too many bureaucratic tasks" as the leading cause of burnout.

Education and training

Medical education and career pathways for doctors vary considerably across the world.

All medical practitioners
In all developed countries, entry-level medical education programs are tertiary-level courses, undertaken at a medical school attached to a university. Depending on jurisdiction and university, entry may follow directly from secondary school or require pre-requisite undergraduate education. The former commonly takes five or six years to complete. Programs that require previous undergraduate education (typically a three- or four-year degree, often in science) are usually four or five years in length. Hence, gaining a basic medical degree may typically take from five to eight years, depending on jurisdiction and university.

Following the completion of entry-level training, newly graduated medical practitioners are often required to undertake a period of supervised practice before full registration is granted, typically one or two years. This may be referred to as an "internship", as the "foundation" years in the UK, or as "conditional registration". Some jurisdictions, including the United States, require residencies for practice.

Medical practitioners hold a medical degree specific to the university from which they graduated. This degree qualifies the medical practitioner to become licensed or registered under the laws of that particular country, and sometimes of several countries, subject to requirements for an internship or conditional registration.

Specialists in internal medicine
Specialty training is begun immediately following completion of entry-level training, or even before. In other jurisdictions, junior medical doctors must undertake generalist (un-streamed) training for one or more years before commencing specialization. Hence, depending on the jurisdiction, a specialist physician (internist) often does not achieve recognition as a specialist until twelve or more years after commencing basic medical training—five to eight years at university to obtain a basic medical qualification, and up to another nine years to become a specialist.

Regulation
In most jurisdictions, physicians (in either sense of the word) need government permission to practice. Such permission is intended to promote public safety, and often to protect government spending, as medical care is commonly subsidized by national governments.

In some jurisdictions such as in Singapore, it is common for physicians to inflate their qualifications with the title "Dr" in correspondence or namecards, even if their qualifications are limited to a basic (e.g., bachelor level) degree. In other countries such as Germany, only physicians holding an academic doctorate may call themselves doctor – on the other hand, the European Research Council has decided that the German medical doctorate does not meet the international standards of a PhD research degree.

All medical practitioners
Among the English-speaking countries, this process is known either as licensure as in the United States, or as registration in the United Kingdom, other Commonwealth countries, and Ireland. In France, Italy and Portugal, civilian physicians must be members of the Order of Physicians to practice medicine.

In some countries, including the United Kingdom and Ireland, the profession largely regulates itself, with the government affirming the regulating body's authority. The best-known example of this is probably the General Medical Council of Britain. In all countries, the regulating authorities will revoke permission to practice in cases of malpractice or serious misconduct.

In the large English-speaking federations (United States, Canada, Australia), the licensing or registration of medical practitioners is done at a state or provincial level, or nationally as in New Zealand. Australian states usually have a "Medical Board", which has now been replaced by the Australian Health Practitioner Regulation Agency (AHPRA) in most states, while Canadian provinces usually have a "College of Physicians and Surgeons". All American states have an agency that is usually called the "Medical Board", although there are alternate names such as "Board of Medicine", "Board of Medical Examiners", "Board of Medical Licensure", "Board of Healing Arts" or some other variation. After graduating from a first-professional school, physicians who wish to practice in the US usually take standardized exams, such as the USMLE for a Doctor in Medicine.

Specialists in internal medicine
Most countries have some method of officially recognizing specialist qualifications in all branches of medicine, including internal medicine. Sometimes, this aims to promote public safety by restricting the use of hazardous treatments. Other reasons for regulating specialists may include standardization of recognition for hospital employment and restriction on which practitioners are entitled to receive higher insurance payments for specialist services.

Performance and professionalism supervision 
The issue of medical errors, drug abuse, and other issues in physician professional behavior received significant attention across the world, in particular following a critical 2000 report which "arguably launched" the patient-safety movement. In the US, as of 2006 there were few organizations that systematically monitored performance. In the US, only the Department of Veterans Affairs randomly drug tests physicians, in contrast to drug testing practices for other professions that have a major impact on public welfare. Licensing boards at the US state-level depend upon continuing education to maintain competence. Through the utilization of the National Practitioner Data Bank, Federation of State Medical Boards' disciplinary report, and American Medical Association Physician Profile Service, the 67 State Medical Boards continually self-report any adverse/disciplinary actions taken against a licensed physician in order that the other Medical Boards in which the physician holds or is applying for a medical license will be properly notified so that corrective, reciprocal action can be taken against the offending physician. In Europe, as of 2009 the health systems are governed according to various national laws, and can also vary according to regional differences similar to the United States.

See also

 AI doctor
 Doctor's office
 Doctor–patient relationship
 Occupations of physicians and surgeons
 International medical graduate
 List of countries and dependencies by number of physicians
 List of medical schools
 List of physicians
 Medic
 Physician-scientist
 Physicians in Canada

References

Further reading
 Bell, Whitfield J. "Medical practice in colonial America". Bulletin of the History of Medicine 31.5 (1957): 442–453. .
 Hamilton, Bernice. "The Medical Professions in the Eighteenth Century". Economic History Review 4#2 1951, pp. 141–169. . In Britain
 Holloway, Sydney WF. "Medical education in England, 1830–1858: A sociological analysis". History 49.167 (1964): 299–324. .
 Keevil, John Joyce. Medicine and the Navy, 1200–1900 (4 vol.; E. & S. Livingstone, 1957) on Royal Navy
 Porter, Roy. Disease, Medicine and Society in England, 1550–1860 (Cambridge University Press, 1995).

External links

 
 

 
Health care occupations
Hospital staff